Lórien was an independent rock band that formed in Nashville, Tennessee. currently they have created one full length album and one EP. they have been included in THE DAILY CHORUS' Top 40 unsigned lineup three times, and in 2007 were included in the Absolutepunk.net absolute 100 list. in 2006 they were the winners of the Cornerstone Festival New Band Showcase and performed at the 2006 Cornerstone Festival. their first full length album, "Esque", was released on February 28, 2008. Lorien will play their last show in late April 2010. four of the members are creating "The Young International" which presumably will have the same feel and tone in their music.

References

External links 
 

Indie rock musical groups from Tennessee
Musical groups from Nashville, Tennessee